Skadarska Krajina (lit. "Skadar Frontier"), simply known as Krajina is a geographical region in southeastern Montenegro stretching from the southern coast of Lake Skadar to the mountain of Rumija, comprising several villages. It is inhabited mainly by Albanians, with a minority of Montenegrins and Serbs. The area is divided between the municipalities of Bar and Ulcinj.

Based on the last parts of the Priest of Duklja, Krajina was a political centre of Duklja. Jovan Vladimir, the ruler of Duklja (ca. 1000–1016), was interred in the Prečista Krajinska church by his widow Kosara, who was also buried in the church. The oldest published Albanian book, Meshari ("the Missal"), was written by Albanian Catholic priest Gjon Buzuku who was born in the village of Livari.

Geography 

The region within Montenegro is located from the  eastern border with Albania near the coast of the Adriatic Sea. It is located between Crmnica and Ana Malit regions and stretches out from Ckla village to Šestani, a sub-region often considered as forming part of wider region of Krajina. It is also between Skadar Lake and the Rumija mountain. Within Montenegro, it mainly consists of villages and small hamlets with Ostros being its most populated settlement (Pop. 230 (2003)). Within Albania, the region of Krajina is bordered on the southern flank by the Tarabosh mountains and only encompasses the coastal village of Zogaj on Lake Skadar.

Within Montenegro, Krajina encompasses some of the following villages and hamlets:
 Arbneš / Arbnesh
 Bobovište / Bobosht
 Blaca / Blac
 Ckla / Skje
 Kostanjica / Kështenjë
 Runja / Runj
 Mali Ostros /  Ostros i Voqël 
 Martići / Martiq
 Tejani / Ftjan
 Veliki Ostros /  Ostrosi i Madh

History  

From what we can see in one Latin manuscript in the 14th century (The Directorium ad passagium faciendum 1332) we get a clear indication of the demographics of the area of that time in the Middle Ages; "The Latins have six towns with bishops: firstly Antibarum (Bar), the seat of the archbishop, then Chatarensis (Kotor), Dulcedinensis (Ulcinj), Suacinensis (Shas), Scutarensis (Shkodra) and Drivascensis (Drisht), which are inhabited by the Latins alone. Outside the town walls, the Albanians make up the population throughout the diocese.". note; this area would later be incorporated into Albania veneta (Venetian Albania) in the 15th century but would be lost later on to the Ottomans according to Dalmatian historian Luigi Paulucci.

Ottoman period 
In the Ottoman defter of 1485 for the Sanjak of Scutari, the nahiyah of Krajna is recorded with a single village of the same name. In the register, Krajna appears as a large settlement with 142 households, and around half of the household heads recorded bore typical Albanian personal names, the other half bearing Slavic anthroponymy possibly attributed to the influence of the Serbian Orthodox Church through the Patriarchate of Peć. In the later register of 1582, the nahiyah had expanded and came to encompass the settlements of Gjonçiq, Ftilan, Pençan, Brisk, Livar, Zogan, Arbanas, Bespod, Babsul, Roviq, Boboshta, Shkllav, Vrajsha, Nadvila, Podgozhan, Muriq, and Koshtanja. The first 11 villages attested predominantly bore Albanian anthroponyms, while the proceeding 4 primarily had Slavic or mixed Albanian-Slavic personal names. Muriq and Koshtanja, however, had a roughly equal number of Albanian and Slavic names.

Demographics 
From the late 1960s to the early 1970s, thousands of locals migrated to countries throughout Europe and to the United States. Between 2,000 and 3,000 people are estimated to live in the Krajina region, with a majority of ethnic Albanians. The religious make-up is Muslim and Christian (Eastern Orthodox and Roman Catholic). Christians mostly reside in the Shestan region, with minorities in Livari, Briska and Tejani.

See also 
Albanians in Montenegro
Hotski Hum
Lower Zeta

References

External links
 Map of the region
 Oto Aksesuar
 Blog post on trip to the Sestani region including ingormation about the history of the region, villages and current status

Sources

Regions of Montenegro
Bar, Montenegro
Ulcinj
Albanian ethnographic regions